The Idaho State Department of Education is an executive agency of the Idaho state education system. The department is responsible for public elementary and secondary school matters as provided by Title 33, Idaho Code, or as determined by the Idaho State Board of Education. It is headquartered in the state capital, Boise, Idaho.

The Idaho State Department of Education is helmed by the Idaho Superintendent of Public Instruction, an elected official.

Each year the Idaho State Department of Education serves more than 300,000 students, at 736 schools, across 115 districts.

Superintendents of Public Instruction 
The Idaho Superintendent of Public Instruction is an elected official and chief executive officer of the State Department of Education responsible for carrying out the policies, procedures, and duties authorized by law or established by the Board for all public elementary and secondary school matters.

The office of superintendent is established in the Idaho Constitution Article IV, Section 1; "The executive department shall consist of a governor, lieutenant governor, secretary of state, state controller, state treasurer, attorney general and superintendent of public instruction, each of whom shall hold his office for four years beginning on the first Monday in January next after his election, commencing with those elected in the year 1946..."

Before 1946, Idaho superintendents of public instruction were elected every two years.

Organization 
Following is the management hierarchy for the Idaho State Department of Education.

Office of the Superintendent

 Superintendent of Public Instruction
 Chief Deputy Superintendent
 Deputy Superintendent, Operations
 Deputy Superintendent, Communications and Policy

Communications and Policy

 Deputy Superintendent, Communications and Policy

Operations

 Deputy Superintendent, Operations
 Director, Accountability
 Director, Assessment
 Director, Federal Programs
 Director, Content and Curriculum
 Director, Special Education
 Coordinator, School Choice
 Coordinator, Indian Education

Management and Educational Services

 Chief Deputy Superintendent
 Management Assistant
 Chief Financial Officer, Public School Finance
 Associate Deputy, Chief Financial Officer
 Contracts and Procurement Officer
 Director, Certification and Professional Standards
 Director, Student Engagement and Safety Coordination
 Director, Child Nutrition Programs
 Director, Student Transportation
 Director, Human Resources and Employment

Responsibilities 
The Idaho State Department of Education implements policies, distributes funds, administers statewide assessments, licenses educators, and provides accountability data for all kindergarten through grade-12 public instruction.

Idaho K-12 charter schools are managed by the Idaho Public Charter School Commission and abide by independent reporting and funding procedures, however, the Idaho State Department of Education works closely with the commission to ensure access, equability, and accountability across all Idaho education efforts. This extends to the inclusion of charter schools in the Idaho Schools "report card" tool, which aggregates performance, progress, and enrollment data for all Idaho public schools.

Programs 
The Idaho State Department of Education supports Idaho schools and students through its work in fourteen areas.

 Accounting
 Assessment & Accountability
 Idaho Reading Indicator
 ISAT Comprehensive Assessment System
 Certification and Professional Standards
 Child Nutrition Programs
 Child and Adult Care Food Program
 School Meals Programs
 Summer Food Service Program
 Content & Curriculum
 Idaho Content Standards
 Federal Programs
 Educator Effectiveness
 English Learner Program/Title III
 Title I, Title II, Title IV, Title V, Title IX
 Idaho Indian Education
 Mastery Education
 Public School Finance
 School Choice
 Alternative Schools
 Home School
 Magnet School
 Special Education
 Results Driven Accountability Monitoring System
 Student Engagement & Safety Coordination
 Advanced Opportunities
 Driver Education
 Idaho Lives Project (in collaboration with the Idaho Department of Health and Welfare)
 School Health Services Program
 Student Transportation
 Technology Services
 E-rate
 Broadband Program

Challenges 
Of the 44 counties in Idaho, seven are urban and 37 are rural as classified by the Idaho Department of Labor. That translates to three quarters of the school districts in Idaho being recognized as rural, per the Idaho statute definition. The schools in these rural areas are regularly challenged to find and retain effective teachers to meet the needs of all of their students, transport students quickly and safely to and from school, and respond to unexpected personnel or technology needs in order to deliver uninterrupted instruction.

In 2021, the statewide high school graduation rate was 80.1 percent while the college enrollment rate was 37 percent. In rural schools, these rates tend to be lower.

Idaho State Board of Education 
The general supervision, governance, and control of the state educational institutions and public school system of the State of Idaho, as with the education system's executive agencies, are vested in the Idaho State Board of Education (SBOE). State statute requires that this Board "...shall consist of the state superintendent of public instruction, who shall be an ex officio voting member and who shall serve as executive secretary of the board for all elementary and secondary school matters..."

Board Members may be contacted through the Office of the State Board of Education. Current members of the Board include:

 Kurt Liebich, President
 Dr. Linda Clark
 Dr. David Hill
 Shawn Keough 
 Bill Gilbert
 Cally Roach
 Cindy Siddoway
 Debbie Critchfield

References

External links
 Official website
 Idaho State Department of Education YouTube

Public education in Idaho
State departments of education of the United States
Education